Yek Santimetr Ta Labkhand is an Iranian television series which takes the viewer both onstage and backstage. It uses four filming formats: story, documentary, hidden camera, and house-to-house. The last is the most intriguing; it involves one person performing in a community's poorest neighborhood as its people gather around him.

Plot
A boy puts on concerts in poor neighborhoods, playing to a hidden camera and making a fuss for comedic effect.

Cast
 Parastoo Salehi
 Reza Rooygari
 Sharzad Kamalzadeh
 Siamak Asharion 
 Hamed Fathi 
 Sharbanoo Mosavai

References

Iranian television series